Squawfish may refer to: 

 Ptychocheilus, a genus of fish. 
 The Colorado pikeminnow, a species of fish. 
 The Northern pikeminnow, a species of fish.